Tillandsia brachycaulos is a species of flowering plant in the genus Tillandsia. It is native to Mexico, Central America, and Venezuela.

Cultivars 
Cultivars include:
Tillandsia 'Ask Harry'
Tillandsia 'Betty'
Tillandsia 'Calum'
Tillandsia 'Eric Knobloch'
Tillandsia 'Heather's Blush'
Tillandsia 'Imbil'
Tillandsia 'Laurie'
Tillandsia 'Maria Teresa L.'
Tillandsia 'Nashville'
Tillandsia 'Neerdie'
Tillandsia 'Richard Oeser'
Tillandsia 'Rongo'
Tillandsia 'Roy'
Tillandsia 'Victoria'
Tillandsia 'Widgee'
Tillandsia 'Wolvi'
Tillandsia 'Yabba'

References 

brachycaulos
Flora of Mexico
Flora of Venezuela
Flora of Central America
Plants described in 1845